Blair Edward Harding was a New Zealand rugby league player who represented New Zealand in 1993.

Playing career
Harding played for Papanui in the Canterbury Rugby League competition. He played for Canterbury in 1993, being part of the side that defeated Auckland to win the National Provincial Competition. Harding was then selected by Howie Tamati to be part of the New Zealand national rugby league team squad that toured Great Britain and France that year.

In 1994 Papanui won the Canterbury Rugby League's Pat Smith Challenge Trophy. Harding also played for the Canterbury Country Cardinals in the new Lion Red Cup competition.

In 1995 Harding moved across town to join the Christchurch City Shiners, Canterbury's other Lion Red Cup team. He also played for the New Zealand Māori side.

Harding continued to represent Canterbury until 1997. He played for the Papanui Tigers during the 1998 season.

Death
Harding died on 11 January 2004, in Christchurch aged 32.

References

Year of birth missing
2004 deaths
New Zealand rugby league players
New Zealand Māori rugby league players
New Zealand Māori rugby league team players
New Zealand national rugby league team players
Canterbury rugby league team players
Papanui Tigers players
Hornby Panthers players
Junior Kiwis players
Rugby league five-eighths
Rugby league centres